Ixabepilone (INN; also known as azaepothilone B, codenamed BMS-247550) is a pharmaceutical drug developed by Bristol-Myers Squibb as a chemotherapeutic medication for cancer.

History
Ixabepilone is a semi-synthetic analog of epothilone B, a natural chemical compound produced by Sorangium cellulosum.  Epothilone B itself could not be developed as a pharmaceutical drug because of poor metabolic stability and pharmacokinetics.  Ixabepilone was designed through medicinal chemistry to improve upon these properties.

Pharmacology
Much like Taxol, Ixabepilone acts to stabilize microtubules.
It is highly potent, capable of damaging cancer cells in very low concentrations, and retains activity in cases where tumor cells are insensitive to taxane type drugs.

Approval
On October 16, 2007, the U.S. Food and Drug Administration approved ixabepilone for the treatment of aggressive metastatic or locally advanced breast cancer no longer responding to currently available chemotherapies. In November 2008, the EMEA has refused a marketing authorisation for Ixabepilone.

Ixabepilone is administered through injection, and is marketed under the trade name Ixempra.

Clinical uses
Ixabepilone, in combination with capecitabine, has demonstrated effectiveness in the treatment of metastatic or locally advanced breast cancer in patients after failure of an anthracycline and a taxane.

It has been investigated for use in treatment of non-Hodgkin's lymphoma.
In pancreatic cancer phase two trial it showed some promising results (used alone). Combination therapy trials are ongoing.

References

External links
 Ixempra product website
 Ixempra prescribing information

Bristol Myers Squibb
Mitotic inhibitors
Thiazoles
Epoxides
Lactams